Estonia competed at the 2020 Summer Olympics in Tokyo. Originally scheduled to take place from 24 July to 9 August 2020, the Games were postponed to 23 July to 8 August 2021, because of the COVID-19 pandemic. It was the nation's eighth consecutive appearance at the Games since 1992 and thirteenth overall in Summer Olympic history.

Estonian government rewards their Olympic gold medalists with a lifetime allowance of 4,600 euros annually with additional support when they approach the retirement age.

Medalists

Competitors
The following is the list of number of competitors in the Games.

Archery

Estonia archers booked Olympic places in the women’s individual recurve based on the world ranking.

Athletics

Estonian athletes achieved the entry standards, either by qualifying time/result or by world ranking, in the following track and field events (up to a maximum of 3 athletes in each event):

Track & road events

Field events

Combined events – Men's decathlon

Badminton

Estonia entered two badminton players (one per gender) into the Olympic tournament. Three-time Olympian Raul Must and rookie Kristin Kuuba were selected into the Olympic based on the BWF World Race to Tokyo Rankings. In the group stage, Must will be played in the group N, while Kuuba in the group D.

Cycling

Road
Estonia entered two riders to compete in the men's Olympic road race, by virtue of their top 50 national finish (for men) in the UCI World Ranking.

Mountain biking
Estonia qualified one mountain biker for the women's Olympic cross-country race, as a result of her nation's seventeenth-place finish in the UCI Olympic Ranking List of 16 May 2021.

Equestrian

With Belarus withdrawing from the tournament, Estonia received an invitation from FEI to send a dressage rider to the Games, as the next highest-ranked eligible nation within the individual FEI Olympic Rankings for Group C (Central & Eastern Europe, Central Asia). This outcome signified the nation's Olympic debut in the equestrian disciplines.

Dressage

Fencing

Estonian fencers qualified a full squad each in the women's team épée for the Games by accepting a spare berth freed up by Africa as the next highest-ranked eligible nation across all regions in the FIE Olympic Team Rankings.

Judo

Estonia entered one male judoka into the Olympic tournament based on the International Judo Federation Olympics Individual Ranking.

Rowing

Estonia qualified one boat in the men's quadruple sculls for the Games by winning the gold medal and securing the first of two remaining berths at the 2021 FISA Final Qualification Regatta in Lucerne, Switzerland.

Qualification Legend: FA=Final A (medal); R=Repechage

Sailing

Estonian sailors qualified one boat in each of the following classes through the 2018 Sailing World Championships, the class-associated Worlds, and the continental regattas.

M = Medal race; EL = Eliminated – did not advance into the medal race

Shooting

Estonia granted an invitation from ISSF to send Rio 2016 Olympian Peeter Olesk (men's 25 m rapid fire pistol) to the rescheduled Games as the highest-ranked shooter vying for qualification in the ISSF World Olympic Rankings of 6 June 2021.

Swimming

Estonian swimmers further achieved qualifying standards in the following events (up to a maximum of 2 swimmers in each event at the Olympic Qualifying Time (OQT), and potentially 1 at the Olympic Selection Time (OST)):

Tennis

At the conclusion of the qualification period for the Olympic tennis tournament, Estonia qualified one tennis player by means of ranking.

Triathlon

Estonia qualified one triathlete by means of world individual ranking.

Wrestling

Estonia qualified two wrestlers for each of the following weight classes into the Olympic competition, all of whom finished among the top six to book Olympic spots in the men's Greco-Roman 130 kg and women's freestyle 76 kg, respectively, at the 2019 World Championships.

Freestyle

Greco-Roman

References

Nations at the 2020 Summer Olympics
2020
2021 in Estonian sport